Jeffrey McClure (born January 22, 1967) is an American former stock car racing driver who raced for multiple years in all three major NASCAR series as well as what is now the ARCA Menards Series. Since the conclusion of his driving career, McClure has remained in ARCA, serving as both a team owner and most recently a crew chief.

Racing career

Driving career

McClure made his Busch debut in 1988, running his own No. 83 Oldsmobile in four races. His series debut came at Nazareth, falling out due to an engine failure. McClure's finishes improved drastically every race and by the race at Langley, McClure earned his best finish of the year in 18th. Also, his best start of the year ended up 12th at Myrtle Beach.

McClure made two starts in 1989. He finished 19th at Charlotte and 25th at Rockingham.

McClure had one start in 1990. He started 41st at Daytona, but was caught up in a crash. However, McClure still managed 22nd and the season opener at Daytona would prove to be his only 1990 start.

McClure only made one career start in NASCAR's Winston Cup Series, which came in 1992 at the 1992 running of the Champion Spark Plug 400. He qualified the Jim Rosenblum Racing 39th at Michigan. He did finish the race, however, it was only a 31st-place finish.

McClure returned after a six-year hiatus in 1996, running three races for Moy Racing. After finishing 26th and 31st, McClure finished 16th at the Milwaukee Mile. It would prove to be his best career finish in the series.

McClure was then invited back for ten races in 1997 for Moy. McClure's team struggled in his starts. His best start was 32nd and his best finish was 23rd at Las Vegas. The poor results can be explained by his five DNFs in ten starts.

McClure reappeared on the NASCAR scene in 2000, running three CTS races for Albernaz Racing. He started 29th and finished 26th at Portland. His next start at Texas proved to be his best. He was 21st in that race. At Nazareth, McClure earned his best career start of 28th and looked to be in good shape for bettering his previous starts. However, a late engine failure ended his CTS career in 23rd.

McClure's start at Nazareth in 2000 ended up being his last NASCAR race as a driver.

Crew chiefing career
In 2008, McClure worked for Fast Track Racing in the ARCA Series, crew chiefing the No. 11 car full time for Bryan Silas. In addition, he crew chiefed FTR's part-time Truck Series team, the No. 48, when Silas and Hermie Sadler made a combined three starts in that truck.

Cal Boprey replaced McClure as the crew chief of the No. 11 of Silas for 2009, and McClure moved to the No. 15 Venturini Motorsports Chevy/Toyota, a part-time car, to crew chief drivers Ryan Fischer, Alex Yontz, Dakoda Armstrong, Justin Marks, Justin Lloyd, Jesse Smith, Josh Richards, and Steve Arpin. He left after one year to crew chief Brazilian rookie Miguel Paludo's No. 77 car for Hattori Racing Enterprises in the K&N East Series.

McClure was crew chief for rookie T. J. Bell's partial Cup Series schedule in 2011 in the No. 50 Toyota/Chevy for LTD Powersports (a team owned by Joe Falk, before he owned Circle Sport). The team shut down after just one year, and McClure went back to ARCA crew chiefing for Andy Belmont Racing's No. 1 Ford and driver Mikey Kile in 2012.

McClure rejoined Venturini Motorsports' ARCA Racing Series team in 2013. He had one win as crew chief for Todd Gilliland in 2015 and two wins with Christopher Bell in 2016. For 2017, he was the crew chief for the No. 15 driven by Christian Eckes and other drivers.

McClure eventually left Venturini (again) and joined Empire Racing as the crew chief for the No. 46 car of Thad Moffitt. The team has an alliance with Richard Petty Motorsports. In 2018, he also served as crew chief for dirt racer Ryan Unzicker at Springfield and DuQuoin (when he needed a crew chief and Moffitt was not running those races).

For the 2020 season, McClure worked for two teams, serving as the crew chief for John Ferrier's family team in ARCA's season-opening race at Daytona, and also for Connor Okrzesik's part-time ARCA Menards Series East team.

Motorsports career results

NASCAR
(key) (Bold – Pole position awarded by qualifying time. Italics – Pole position earned by points standings or practice time. * – Most laps led.)

Winston Cup Series

Busch Series

Craftsman Truck Series

ARCA Bondo/Mar-Hyde Series
(key) (Bold – Pole position awarded by qualifying time. Italics – Pole position earned by points standings or practice time. * – Most laps led.)

References

External links
 
 
 

1967 births
Living people
NASCAR drivers
People from Harrisburg, North Carolina
Racing drivers from Charlotte, North Carolina
Racing drivers from North Carolina
ARCA Menards Series drivers